Gayleen Froese (born 1972) is a Canadian novelist and singer-songwriter. She is the author of two paranormal mystery novels, the urban fantasy novel "The Dominion", and the Ben Ames Casefiles series of detective novels.  Her third novel, "The Girl Whose Luck Ran Out", has been translated into French and German. 

Born in Saskatoon, Saskatchewan, Froese was educated at Ryerson University (now Toronto Metropolitan University) in Toronto. Her first album, Obituary, won an Undiscovered Artist Award from CBC Radio and Froese was a showcase artist at Toronto's North by Northeast music festival in 1998. 

Froese appeared on Canadian Learning Television's A Total Write Off in 2006, and was one of twelve writers selected as a finalist for BookTelevision's 3 Day Novel Contest in 2007.  (Filmed in 2007, the show did not air until late 2009; Froese ended up as the winning contestant.)  She was also twice shortlisted in the overall International Three-Day Novel Contest. 

Froese's fourth novel, The Dominion, was released in serialized format on Webtoon (platform)'s Yonder app, beginning January 4, 2023, with print publication to follow. Froese's non-fiction and humour writing has appeared in publications including See Magazine, The Rat Creek Press, and Edify 

Currently, Froese lives in Alberta Avenue, Edmonton, in Edmonton, Alberta.

Bibliography 
 Touch (2005) 
 Grayling Cross (2011) 
 The Girl Whose Luck Ran Out (2022) 
 The Dominion (2023)  Yonder / DSP Publications

Discography 
 Obituary (1997)
 Chimera (1999)

References

External links
 Gayleen Froese
 DSP-The Girl Whose Luck Ran Out by Gayleen Froese
 Crime Writers of Canada
 IMDB-Gayleen Froese 

1972 births
Living people
Canadian mystery writers
Canadian women singer-songwriters
Musicians from Saskatoon
Writers from Saskatoon
Musicians from Edmonton
Writers from Edmonton
Writers from Prince Albert, Saskatchewan
Canadian women novelists
Women mystery writers
21st-century Canadian women singers
20th-century Canadian women singers